Madison Saracen is a British-based UCI trade team, specialising in downhill mountain biking.

In 2018 the team announced the signing of two-time world champion Danny Hart. 

Founded in 2011, the team achieved great success with Manon Carpenter and later Matt Walker.

Carpenter became junior UCI Mountain Bike Downhill World Champion in the team’s debut season, before going on to take the senior titles of the UCI Mountain Bike Downhill World Cup and World Championships in 2014.

Walker became junior UCI Mountain Bike Downhill World Champion in 2017.

History

Formation 
Launched in 2011 the team’s aspiration was clearly laid out by Madison CEO Dominic Langan.

“The first year is mainly a development squad, with a couple of people riding the world cup series. It’s a minimum three-year program and hopefully we’ll be doing much more beyond that – the aim is to get more riders into the world cup series.

“We hope to build that up and hopefully we can get some champions. We just want to get good British riders out there.”

Team progression 
Manon Carpenter took the team’s first major win at the junior world championships in Champery, Switzerland.

The win was followed by the appointment of Tim Flooks as team manager in November 2011, but he was forced to stand down soon after due to health problems.

In February 2012, Will Longden took the position of team manager.

Longden – himself a four-time British champion in downhill, fourcross and dual slalom – took the reins of the team following a period of time coaching the MBUK development squad. He was also British Cycling’s rider representative for downhill mountain biking.

In 2012 Manon Carpenter took the team’s first world cup and world championship podium results.

Longden strengthened the team in 2013 signing Sam Dale, as Carpenter visited the world cup podium in five out of six rounds.

By 2014 the team was split in two. A factory race team would contest the biggest races spearheaded by Carpenter, Dale and new signing Matt Simmonds.

Alongside the factory team a development team was launched.

Following the split the team had its most successful season as Carpenter won the world cup series overall and the world championships.

A second-place from Simmonds at the final world cup of the season was enough to place the team third in the end-of-series standings.

In 2015 the Madison Saracen factory retained the services of Simmonds, Carpenter and Dale.

After a tumultuous start to the season, Carpenter would recover to finish second overall in the world cup and take silver at the world championships.

In December 2015 Madison Saracen announced its new roster and the signing of Marc Beaumont. 

But it was junior Matt Walker who would make the biggest impact, with his first world cup win coming in Cairns. 

In December 2016 Carpenter departed the team, with Alex Marin joining the lineup and the standalone development team re-launching.

Matt Walker won his second junior world cup, before going on to win the World Championships in Cairns, Australia.

In January 2018, the team announced their new lineup, with Danny Hart joining Alex Marin and Matt Walker.

Team roster 

2018

Factory Racing Team

2017

Factory Racing Team

2016

Factory Racing Team

2015

Factory Racing Team

Development Team

2014

Factory Racing Team

2013

2012

2011

Title sponsors 
Madison Clothing

Saracen bikes

Results

2016

UCI Mountain Bike World Cup Downhill 
Round 5 Lenzerheide, Switzerland - 4th Manon Carpenter senior women
Round 4 Leogang, Austria - 5th Manon Carpenter senior women
Round 3 Fort William, Great Britain - 3rd Manon Carpenter senior women
Round 2 Cairns, Australia - 1st Matt Walker, junior men; 3rd Manon Carpenter senior women
Round 1 Lourdes, France - 2nd Matt Walker, junior men; 3rd Manon Carpenter senior women
 
2015
2nd DH, UCI Mountain Bike World Cup Overall - Manon Carpenter
2nd DH, UCI Mountain Bike World Championships, Vallnord, Andorra - Manon Carpenter
3rd DH, UCI Mountain Bike World Cup Team Standing Overall - Madison Saracen

UCI Mountain Bike World Cup Downhill 
3rd Round 2 Fort William, Great Britain senior women - Manon Carpenter
2nd Round 4 Lenzerheide, Switzerland senior women - Manon Carpenter
2nd Round 5 Mont Sainte Anne, Canada senior women - Manon Carpenter
2nd Round 6 Windham, USA senior women - Manon Carpenter
3rd Round 7 Val di Sole, Italy senior women - Manon Carpenter

2014 
1st  DH, UCI Mountain Bike World Cup - Manon Carpenter
1st  DH, UCI Mountain Bike World Championships, Hafjell, Norway - Manon Carpenter
2nd DH, UCI Mountain Bike World Cup Team Standing Overall - Madison Saracen

UCI Mountain Bike World Cup Downhill 
1st Round 1 Pietermaritzburg, South Africa, senior women - Manon Carpenter
2nd Round 2 Cairns, Australia, senior women - Manon Carpenter
1st Round 4 Leogang, Austria, senior women - Manon Carpenter
1st Round 5 Mont Sainte Anne, Canada, senior women - Manon Carpenter
2nd Round 7 Meribel, France, senior women - Manon Carpenter, SILVER Matt Simmonds

2013
3rd DH, UCI Mountain Bike World Cup - Manon Carpenter

UCI Mountain Bike World Cup Downhill
2nd Round 1 Fort William, Great Britain, senior women - Manon Carpenter
2nd Round 2 Val di Sole, Italy, junior men - Phil Atwill
2nd Round 3 La Massana, Andorra, senior women - Manon Carpenter
2nd Round 4 Mont Sainte Anne, Canada, senior women - Manon Carpenter
2nd Round 5 Hafjell, Norway, senior women - Manon Carpenter
3rd Round 6 Leogang, Austria, senior women - Manon Carpenter

2nd  DH, British National Mountain Biking Championships, senior women - Manon Carpenter

2012
3rd DH, UCI Mountain Bike & Trials World Championships Elite, Leogang, Austria - Manon Carpenter

UCI Mountain Bike World Cup Downhill
Round 1 Pietermaritzburg, South Africa, senior women - Manon Carpenter

2nd  DH, British National Mountain Biking Championships, senior women - Manon Carpenter
3rd  DH, British National Mountain Biking Championships, youth men - Will Weston

2011
 1st  DH, UCI Mountain Bike & Trials World Championships, junior women, - Manon Carpenter
 1st  DH, UCI Mountain Bike World Cup, Series Overall, junior women -  Manon Carpenter

 1st  DH, British National Mountain Biking Championships, junior women - Manon Carpenter
 1st  DH, British National Mountain Biking Championships, youth men - Phillip Atwill

References

Cycle racing in the United Kingdom
Cycling teams established in 2011
2011 establishments in the United Kingdom